The Witwatersrand Command was a Command of the South African Army. It was one of the ten regional commands, which, with the Walvis Bay Military Area, made up the Territorial Force.

History

Origin
Based in Johannesburg, it was responsible for the security of the region, forming the primary level of command for military operations in support of the Police. It also provided logistic, administrative and service support to units and formations operating in its area of responsibility.

When 6th Light Anti-Aircraft Regiment SAA became operational in 1966 with its headquarters at Brakpan, it was originally administratively responsible to Headquarters Witwatersrand Command, but was later transferred to I South African Corps.

In 1987, the command headquarters installation was the target of a bomb by Umkhonto we Sizwe operative Hein Grosskopf.

Amalgamation with Northern Transvaal Command into Gauteng Command

Groups and Commando Units

Group 16 (Marievale) 
 Delmas Commando
 Nigel Commando
 Springs Commando

Group 17 (Midvaal) 
 Iscor Commando
 Krugersdorp Commando
 Meyerton Commando
 Vaal Commando
 Vanderbijl Park Commando
 Vereeniging Commando

Group 18 (Doornkop) 
 East Park Commando
 Gatsrand Commando
 Johannesburg East Commando
 Johannesburg West Commando
 Randburg Commando
 Roodepoort Commando
 Wemmerspan Commando
 West Rand Commando

Group 41 (Primrose) 
 Atlas Commando
 Benoni Commando
 Brakpan Commando
 Boksburg Commando
 Germiston Commando
 Kempton Park Commando

Group 42 (Lenz) 
 Alberton Commando
 Edenvale Commando
 Modderfontein Commando
 Sandton Commando

Leadership

References 

Commands of the South African Army
Disbanded military units and formations in Johannesburg
Military units and formations disestablished in the 1990s